David Chambers may refer to:

David Chambers (congressman) (1780–1864), U.S. Representative from Ohio
David John Chambers (born 1930), English bibliographer, printing historian, printer and book-collector
Dave Chambers (born 1940), Canadian ice hockey coach
Dave Chambers (footballer) (born 1947), English professional footballer
Blindboy Boatclub (David Chambers), comedian with The Rubberbandits